Mahereza is a rural municipality in Madagascar. It belongs to the district of Ambohidratrimo (district), which is a part of Analamanga Region.

References

Monographie Region Analamanga

Populated places in Analamanga